Outer Isolation is the second full-length album recorded by the band Vektor. It was released in 2011 on Heavy Artillery Records, and Earache Records reissued the album in 2012. The final tracks of the album, "Fast Paced Society" and the title track, feature radio emissions of Saturn detected by Cassini.

Track listing

Personnel
David DiSanto – guitar, vocals
Erik Nelson – guitar
Frank Chin – bass guitar
Blake Anderson – drums

References

2011 albums
Vektor (band) albums
Earache Records albums